Eastburn is a village within the Steeton with Eastburn civil parish, in the City of Bradford Metropolitan District, West Yorkshire, England.  The road through Eastburn is approximately 1/2 mile long with a post office, fish and chip shop and a public house called The NightingGale; The village also contains a school (Eastburn Junior & Infant School), a small chapel, a farm, a factory (Cinetic Landis Ltd) and a former mill building which houses many business, including a fitness centre and furniture showroom.

Governance
The village is part of the civil parish of Steeton with Eastburn. The parish is part of the Craven ward of the Metropolitan borough of the City of Bradford, part of the Metropolitan county of West Yorkshire.

Population
Population according to the 2011 census:

References

External links 

Villages in West Yorkshire
Geography of the City of Bradford